Santiago Urtizberea Oñatibia (25 July 1909 – 18 January 1985) was a Spanish footballer who played as a forward.

Career
Born in Irun, Urtizberea played for Real Unión and Real Sociedad. He also played for Girondins ASP in the 1941 and 1943 Coupe de France Final.

Personal life
His brother Claudio Urtizberea was also a footballer.

References

1909 births
1985 deaths
Footballers from the Basque Country (autonomous community)
Spanish footballers
Real Sociedad footballers
Real Unión footballers
La Liga players
FC Girondins de Bordeaux players
Ligue 1 players
Spanish football managers
FC Girondins de Bordeaux managers
Sportspeople from Irun
Association football forwards